Lake Christabel is a small lake in the north of New Zealand's South Island. It is located 12 kilometres southwest of the Lewis Pass. The lake is the source of the Grey River, one of the longest rivers on the South Island's West Coast, although its outlet is underground. The lake lies behind a landslide dam, thought to have been created by a prehistoric earthquake. A 1976 survey said it was, "one of the very few lakes in New Zealand in a natural, unmodified state". Galaxias brevipinnis (climbing galaxias) and Anquilla dieffenbachii (longfin eel) were the only fish found.

References

Buller District
Lakes of the West Coast, New Zealand